Christie's International Real Estate is an international network of independently-owned luxury real estate firms with more than 400 offices and approximately 10,000 real estate agents in nearly 50 countries and territories around the world. The brand is separately owned but strategically partnered with Christie’s, the fine art auction house.

History 
Christie’s International Real Estate was originally founded in 1987 as Great Estates. In 1995, the Great Estates brand was acquired by Christie’s, the London-based auction house, and in 2011, Christie’s changed the name from Christie’s Great Estates to Christie’s International Real Estate. In December 2021, a venture led by Mike Golden and Thad Wong, co-founders of Chicago-based real estate brokerage and technology firm @properties, acquired Christie’s International Real Estate from Christie’s, entering into a long-term global brand licensing agreement.

Notable sales 
Significant sales from the Christie's International Real Estate network include: 
 Copper Beech Farm (Greenwich, Connecticut). The 50-acre waterfront estate was sold in April 2014 for US$120,000,000 and was, at the time of sale, the highest residential transaction ever recorded in the United States.
 Hotel De Soyecourt (Paris, France), which sold in September 2006 and was listed at €100,000,000.
 The Playboy Mansion (Los Angeles, California), which sold for over US$100,000,000 in 2016.  
 Kaiuso (Kyoto, Japan), which sold in December 2009 and was listed at ¥8,000,000,000. 
 Gouverneur Bay Estate (St. Barthélemy, French West Indies), which sold in 2009 for €61,200,000 (approximately US$89,000,000).
 The Manor (Holmby Hills, Los Angeles, California), which sold in June 2011 for US$85,000,000.
 The Elaine Estate (Sydney, Australia, which sold in April 2017 for more than A$70,000,000.
 Triplex Penthouse in the Golden Square (Monte Carlo, Monaco), which sold in March 2017 for US$61,000,000. 
 Little Jennie Ranch (Jackson Hole, Wyoming), which sold in 2005 and was listed at US$55,000,000.
 Conyers Farm Estate (Greenwich, Connecticut), which sold in August 2004 and was listed at US$53,000,000.
 Beachfront estate (Jupiter Island) on 2 acres with direct access to the Atlantic Ocean and the Intracoastal Waterway, represented by Illustrated Properties, is sold in May 2022 for $35 million making it the second most-expensive real estate deal on the island.
 Record-breaking $21 million sale for Paradise Valley, Arizona 7-bedroom, 15,700-square-foot main house plus guest house on 4.27 acres with views of Camelback Mountain represented by Walt Danley Realty.
 Waterfront home in Vaucluse sells in October 2022 for AUS $60 million represented by Ken Jacobs Christie’s International Real Estate..
 A 2-acre island in Palm Beach, Florida, the only private island in Palm Beach, with a mansion, swimming pool and tennis court sells for US$85 million represented by Premier Estate Properties.
 Homestead property (Whitefish, Montana), with 3 lodges situated on a 1,700-acrea property with 2 miles of Stillwater River frontage sells for US$55 million. Represented by PureWest Real Estate. Sold June 2021. 
 9,000-square-foot penthouse (Midtown Manhattan) sells in June 2021 for US$30 million represented by Christie’s International Real Estate.

References

Further reading 
 "Fighting for Turf: Sotheby's vs. Christie's" from The New York Times (1996) 
 "New Sotheby's Franchises Expand Into Low-End Housing" from The Wall Street Journal (2007)
 "@properties looks beyond Chicago with Christie’s deal" from Housing Wire (2021)

External links 
 Christie’s International Real Estate

Lifestyle magazines published in the United Kingdom
Luxury real estate
Magazines established in 1987
Real estate services companies
Property services companies of the United Kingdom
Christie's
Quarterly magazines published in the United Kingdom
Magazines published in London